Evelyn Mawuli (馬瓜 エブリン; born 2 June 1995) is a Japanese professional basketball player. She competed at the 2020 Summer Olympics, winning a silver medal. Evelyn was born to Ghanaian parents in Toyohashi, Aichi. At the age of 14, she naturalized along with her entire family to become a Japanese citizen, in order to represent Japan in international tournaments.

Career

WJBL
Mawuli played for the Aisin AW Wings, a team based in Anjō, since the 2014–15 season where she made her professional debut. In 2017, Mawuli signed with the Nagoya-based, Toyota Antelopes for the 2017–18 season.

National team

Youth level
Mawuli made her international debut at the 2009 FIBA Asia Under-16 Championship in India where Japan took home the silver medal. She was again named to the Under-16 team, for the 2011 FIBA Asia Under-16 Championship, where Japan won Gold. Mawuli was named to the team for the 2012 FIBA Under-17 World Championship in Amsterdam, Netherlands. Japan finished the tournament in fourth place and Mawuli was named to the All-Tournament Team.

Senior level
Mawuli made her debut with the senior national team, at the 2014 Asian Games. Where Japan placed in third, taking home the bronze. Mawuli was then named to the roster for the 2017 FIBA Women's Asia Cup in Bengalore, India.

References

External links

1995 births
Living people
Naturalized citizens of Japan
Japanese women's basketball players
Japanese people of Ghanaian descent
Sportspeople of Ghanaian descent
Small forwards
Asian Games medalists in basketball
Basketball players at the 2014 Asian Games
Asian Games bronze medalists for Japan
People from Toyohashi
Medalists at the 2014 Asian Games
Basketball players at the 2020 Summer Olympics
Olympic basketball players of Japan
Olympic medalists in basketball
Olympic silver medalists for Japan
Medalists at the 2020 Summer Olympics